is a Japanese basketball coach. He was the assistant coach of the Japan women's national basketball team from 1998 to 2000 and 2012.

Honors
National Sports Festival of Japan title (2006)

Head coaching record

|- 
| style="text-align:left;"|Denso
| style="text-align:left;"|2010-11
| 38||19||9|||| style="text-align:center;"|3rd|||3||1||2||
| style="text-align:center;"|3rd
|- 
| style="text-align:left;"|Denso
| style="text-align:left;"|2011-12
| 28||20||8|||| style="text-align:center;"|3rd|||2||0||2||
| style="text-align:center;"|3rd
|- 
| style="text-align:left;"|Denso
| style="text-align:left;"|2012-13
| 29||12||17|||| style="text-align:center;"|7th|||-||-||-||
| style="text-align:center;"|7th
|- 
| style="text-align:left;"|Denso
| style="text-align:left;"|2013-14
| 33||26||7|||| style="text-align:center;"|3rd|||6||2||4||
| style="text-align:center;"|Runners-up
|- 
| style="text-align:left;"|Denso
| style="text-align:left;"|2014-15
| 30||24||6|||| style="text-align:center;"|2nd|||2||0||2||
| style="text-align:center;"|3rd
|- 
| style="text-align:left;"|Denso
| style="text-align:left;"|2015-16
| 24||16||8|||| style="text-align:center;"|4th|||2||0||2||
| style="text-align:center;"|4th
|- 
| style="text-align:left;"|Denso
| style="text-align:left;"|2016-17
| 27||15||12|||| style="text-align:center;"|5th|||2||0||2||
| style="text-align:center;"|3rd
|- 
| style="text-align:left;"|Denso
| style="text-align:left;"|2017-18
| 33||26||7|||| style="text-align:center;"|2nd|||3||2||1||
| style="text-align:center;"|Runners-up
|- 
| style="text-align:left;"|Denso
| style="text-align:left;"|2018-19
| 22||15||7|||| style="text-align:center;"|4th|||3||1||2||
| style="text-align:center;"|4th
|-

References

1967 births
Living people
Japanese basketball coaches
Japanese women's basketball coaches
Prestige International Aranmare Akita coaches
Sportspeople from Kanagawa Prefecture